The canton of Vaucouleurs is an administrative division of the Meuse department, northeastern France. Its borders were modified at the French canton reorganisation which came into effect in March 2015. Its seat is in Vaucouleurs.

It consists of the following communes:
 
Bovée-sur-Barboure
Boviolles
Brixey-aux-Chanoines
Broussey-en-Blois
Burey-en-Vaux
Burey-la-Côte
Chalaines
Champougny
Cousances-lès-Triconville
Culey
Dagonville
Épiez-sur-Meuse
Erneville-aux-Bois
Goussaincourt
Laneuville-au-Rupt
Loisey
Marson-sur-Barboure
Maxey-sur-Vaise
Méligny-le-Grand
Méligny-le-Petit
Ménil-la-Horgne
Montbras
Montigny-lès-Vaucouleurs
Naives-en-Blois
Nançois-le-Grand
Nançois-sur-Ornain
Neuville-lès-Vaucouleurs
Ourches-sur-Meuse
Pagny-la-Blanche-Côte
Pagny-sur-Meuse
Reffroy
Rigny-la-Salle
Rigny-Saint-Martin
Saint-Aubin-sur-Aire
Saint-Germain-sur-Meuse
Salmagne
Saulvaux
Sauvigny
Sauvoy
Sepvigny
Sorcy-Saint-Martin
Taillancourt
Troussey
Ugny-sur-Meuse
Vaucouleurs
Villeroy-sur-Méholle
Void-Vacon
Willeroncourt

References

Cantons of Meuse (department)